Manogepix (E1210) is an isoxazole-based broad-spectrum antifungal. Manogepix targets GPI-protein biosynthesis.

Manogepix is the active metabolite of the prodrug fosmanogepix.

References 

Antifungals
Aminopyridines